Augustus Granville Stapleton (1800 – 1880) was an English biographer and political pamphleteer.

Biography
Stapleton was educated at Rugby School and Trinity Hall, Cambridge. After graduating he became private secretary to the Foreign Secretary, George Canning, and remained with him until Canning became Prime Minister in 1827. Canning died a few months later and Stapleton subsequently published an extensive biography.

Publications
The Political Life of the Right Honourable George Canning, 2 volumes, Longman, London, 1831 (second edition, 3 volumes, 1831)
George Canning and His Times, John W. Parker & Son, London, 1859
and many pamphlets and contributions to newspapers

References

1800 births
1880 deaths
People educated at Rugby School
Alumni of Trinity Hall, Cambridge
Principal Private Secretaries to the Secretary of State for Foreign and Commonwealth Affairs
English biographers
English pamphleteers